Jacob David (15 November 1873 – 26 May 1967) was a Persian-born Assyrian pastor and relief worker. He was born in Seyr (Sir), a village to the west of the city of Urmia, and died in Chicago.

Sources
 

People from West Azerbaijan Province
Iranian Assyrian people
1873 births
1967 deaths
Iranian emigrants to the United States
American people of Iranian-Assyrian descent
Iranian Christians